Guillermo Andrés Tambussi (born 12 November 1982) is an Argentine footballer.

External links
 
 

1982 births
Living people
Argentine footballers
Argentine expatriate footballers
Racing Club de Avellaneda footballers
Boca Unidos footballers
Club Deportivo Palestino footballers
Argentine Primera División players
Chilean Primera División players
Expatriate footballers in Chile
Estudiantes de Río Cuarto footballers
Association football forwards
Sportspeople from Mar del Plata